A cricketer is a person who plays cricket. 

Cricketer may also refer to:
The Cricketer, a British magazine
The Wisden Cricketer, as it was known from 2003-2011
The Cricketer (Pakistani magazine)

See also
The cricketers, a painting by Russell Drysdale